The 1980 Campionati Internazionali di Sicilia, also known as the Palermo Grand Prix or the Sicilian Open, was a men's tennis tournament played on outdoor clay courts in Palermo, Italy that was part of the 1980 Volvo Grand Prix. It was the second edition of the tournament and took place from 8 September until 14 September 1980. First-seeded Guillermo Vilas won the singles title.

Finals

Singles
 Guillermo Vilas defeated  Paul McNamee 6–4, 6–0, 6–0
 It was Vilas' 3rd singles title of the year and the 49th of his career.

Doubles
 Ricardo Ycaza /  Gianni Ocleppo defeated  Víctor Pecci /  Balázs Taróczy 6–2, 6–2

References

External links
 ITF tournament edition details

Campionati Internazionali di Sicilia
Campionati Internazionali di Sicilia
Campionati Internazionali di Sicilia